The 2012 Campeonato Brasileiro Série C, the third level of the Brazilian League, would be contested by 20 clubs from May 27 until November 4, 2012. Top four teams in the table will qualify to the Campeonato Brasileiro Série B to be contested in 2013, meanwhile the bottom four will be relegated to Campeonato Brasileiro Série D.

Due to legal issues, the STJD suspended the Série C and Série D until the issues were settled. After 32 days, the CBF confirmed that the Série C started at June 30 and ended on December 1.

Rule changes

Unlike previous years, in 2012 participating clubs will be divided in two groups of 10, instead of the four groups of five clubs, the system adopted by 2011. Thus, all teams will be involved in the tournament until the end of the year. The amendment will allow all clubs in the competition to play at least 18 games in the tournament. The top of each group will advance to the knockout stage for the decisive stages of the quarterfinals, semifinals and final. The semifinalists will be promoted to the Series B 2013.

Teams

First stage

Group A

Matches

Group B

Matches

Final stage

Top goalscorers

Source:

References

Campeonato Brasileiro Série C seasons
3